Silas Stow (December 21, 1773January 19, 1827) was an American lawyer, politician, and judge.  He served in the United States House of Representatives during the 12th United States Congress (1811–1813), representing New York's 10th congressional district.

Biography
Born in Middlefield in the Connecticut Colony, he attended the common schools and studied law, but never practiced. He moved to Lowville, Lewis County, New York and engaged in agricultural pursuits. He became land agent for Nicholas Low and moved to Oneida County in 1797.  He was appointed judge of Oneida County on January 28, 1801. He returned to Lewis County and was elected as a Democratic-Republican to the 12th United States Congress, holding office from March 4, 1811 to March 3, 1813. He was Sheriff of Lewis County, New York from 1814 to 1815. He was First Judge of Lewis County, New York, from 1815 to 1823. Stow died in Lowville in 1827; interment was in East State Street Burying Ground.

Personal life and family
Stow was the youngest of eight children born to Elihu Stow and Jemima Paine Stow.  His older brothers, Elihu, Obed, and Joshua served in the American Revolutionary War, and his father was zealous patriot who supplied materiel to the Continental Army.

Stow married Mary Ruggles on July 26, 1801.  Ruggles was the sister of General George D. Ruggles.  They had three children together:
 Alexander W. Stow was the 1st Chief Justice of the Wisconsin Supreme Court.
 Marcellus K. Stow was a merchant in Fond du Lac, Wisconsin.
 Horatio J. Stow was a New York State Senator.

References

External links 

 

1773 births
1827 deaths
People from Middlefield, Connecticut
People from Lowville, New York
People from Oneida County, New York
New York (state) lawyers
Burials in New York (state)
Democratic-Republican Party members of the United States House of Representatives from New York (state)
Sheriffs of Lewis County, New York
19th-century American lawyers